East Asia, Eastern Asia, or Eastasia can refer to:

 East Asia, the geographical region
 Eastern Asia (WGSRPD), a region used in recording the distribution of plants
 East Asia (album), a record by Miyuki Nakajima
 Eastasia (Nineteen Eighty-Four), a fictional superstate in George Orwell's book 1984